Rogues is a commune in the Gard department in southern France.

Population

See also
Communes of the Gard department
Causse de Blandas

References

External links

wiktionary:Rogues

Communes of Gard